Przebędowo  is a village in the administrative district of Gmina Murowana Goślina, within Poznań County, Greater Poland Voivodeship, in west-central Poland. It has a former manor house (built 1890), park, former industrial sites and farm buildings, as well as residential blocks.

From 1953 to 1998, a mediumwave broadcasting station working on 738 kHz with a 215 metres high mast was near the village.

References

Villages in Poznań County